Jacoba Georgina Bernarda "Cobie" Floor (-van Daatselaar) first name also written as Coby (born 20 May 1930) was a Dutch  diver. She was trained by trainer Bosch.

Floor made her debut at the Dutch championships in 1943 and finished fourth. She classified second in second in 1944 and won the title in 1946 and 1947. Because of her achievements, she was selected by the KNZB to participate at the 1947 European Championships in Monaco. At these championships she finished sixth. 

She finished second during an international competition in March 1948. Floor won the silver medal at the national championships in 1948 behind Kiki Heck. Both would represent the Netherlands a few weeks later at the 1948 Summer Olympics. She competed in the women's 3 metre springboard event at the 1948 Summer Olympics. She did not perform well during the first series of four compulsory dives. According to the newspaper she seemed not did to be rested. She was ranked 12th after the four compulsory jumps, and would stay 12th after the four facultative dives.

She won the silver medal at the national championships in 1950 behind Leni Lanting-Keller. Floor married swimmer Rinus van Daatselaar.

References

External links
 

1930 births
Year of death missing
Dutch female divers
Olympic divers of the Netherlands
Divers at the 1948 Summer Olympics
Divers from Amsterdam